Shuimogou District is one of 7 urban districts of the prefecture-level city of Wulumuqi, the capital of Xinjiang Uygur Autonomous Region, Northwest China. According to the 2002 census, it has a population of 150,000.

Tourist attractions 
Qingquan Temple is a Buddhist temple in the district.

References 

County-level divisions of Xinjiang
Ürümqi